Satnam is the main word that appears in the Sikh sacred scripture called the Guru Granth Sahib. It is part of the Gurbani shabad called Mool Mantra which is repeated daily by Sikhs. This word succeeds the word "Ek-onkar" which means "There is only one constant" or commonly "There is one God". The word sat means "true/everlasting" and nam means "name". In this instance, this would mean, "whose name is truth". Satnam is referred to God as the Name of God is True and Everlasting.

The word nam in Sikhism has two meanings. "It meant both an application and a symbol of the All-pervading Supreme Reality that sustained the universe. Guru Nanak in his teachings emphasized the need of repeating Sat-Nam to realize the All-pervading Supreme Reality."

References 

Shabda
Sikh practices
Sanskrit words and phrases
Names of God in Sikhism
Sikh terminology